Aksentijević is a Serbian surname. Notable people with the surname include:

Dragoslav Pavle Aksentijević (born 1942), Serbian painter, singer and conductor
Miodrag Aksentijević (born 1983), Serbian futsal player
Nikola Aksentijević (born 1993), Serbian footballer
Srđan Aksentijević (born 1986), Turkish water polo player
Vladan Aksentijević (born 1977), Serbian musician, better known as Ajs Nigrutin

Serbian surnames
Slavic-language surnames
Patronymic surnames